The Weightlifting Competition at the 2000 Summer Olympics in Sydney, Australia saw the introduction of women's weightlifting.

Medalists

Men

Women

Notes
 Ivan Ivanov of Bulgaria originally won the silver medal, but was disqualified after testing positive for furosemide.
 Sevdalin Minchev of Bulgaria originally won the bronze medal, but was disqualified after testing positive for furosemide.
 Ashot Danielyan of Armenia originally won the bronze medal, but was disqualified after testing positive for stanozolol.
 Izabela Dragneva of Bulgaria originally won the gold medal, but was disqualified after testing positive for furosemide.

Medal table

Participating nations
A total number of 261 weightlifters from 73 nations competed at the Sydney Games:

References

Sources
 

 
Olympic
2000 Summer Olympics events
2000
Weightlifting in Australia